Italy competed at the 2015 European Games, in Baku, Azerbaijan from 12 to 28 June 2015. 295 athletes (168 men and 127 women) competed in 23 sports.

Medalists

Archery

Italy has qualified for three quota places in both the men's and the women's archery events at the Games, and as a result has also qualified for the team events.

Badminton

 Men's individual – 1 athlete
 Men's team – 1 team of 2 athletes
 Women's individual – 1 athlete
 Mixed team – 1 team of 2 athletes

Basketball

 Men's team – 1 team of 4 athletes

Beach soccer

 Men's team – 1 team of 12 athletes

Boxing

Women's 51 kg
Women's 54 kg
Women's 60 kg
Women's 64 kg
Women's 70 kg

Canoe sprint

 Men's K1 200m
 Men's K2 200m	
 Men's C1 1000m
 Women's K1 200m
 Women's K1 500m
 Women's K1 5000m
 Women's K2 200m	
 Women's K2 500m

Cycling

Men's road race – 5 athletes
Women's road race – 5 athletes
Men's time trial – 2 athletes
Men's time trial – 2 athletes

Mountain biking
Men's cross country – 3 athletes
Men's cross country – 2 athletes

BMX
 Men's – 2 athletes

Fencing
Men's Épée – Gabriele Bino, Gabriele Cimini, Marco Fichera, Andrea Santarelli
Men's Foil – Alessio Foconi, Francesco Ingargiola, Lorenzo Nista, Damiano Rosatelli
Men's Sabre – Luigi Miracco, Massimiliano Murolo, Alberto Pellegrini, Giovanni Repetti
Men's Épée team – 1 team of 4 athletes
Men's Sabre team – 1 team of 4 athletes
Men's Foil team – 1 team of 4 athletes
Women's Épée – Camilla Batini, Francesca Boscarelli, Brenda Briasco, Alberta Santuccio
Women's Foil – Chiara Cini, Valentina Cipriani, Carolina Erba, Alice Volpi
Women's Sabre – Sofia Ciaraglia, Martina Criscio, Caterina Navarria, Rebecca Gargano
Women's Épée team – 1 team of 4 athletes
Women's Sabre team – 1 team of  4 athletes
Women's Foil team – 1 team of  4 athletes

Gymnastics

Aerobic

 Pairs – 1 pair of 2 athletes
 Groups – 1 team of 5 athletes

Artistic
Women's – 3 quota places
Men's – 3 quota places

Rhythmic

 Individual – 1 quota place
 Groups – 1 team of 6 athletes

Trampoline
 Men's individual – 1 quota place

Karate

 Men's 60 kg
 Men's 75 kg
 Men's 80 kg
 Men's Kata

Sambo

 Men's 74 kg

Table tennis

 Men's individual – 1 quota place

Triathlon

Men's – Matthias Steinwandter, Delian Stateff, Riccardo De Palma
Women's – Elena Maria Petrini, Alessia Orla, Lisa Schanung

Water polo

Men's – 1 team of 13 athletes
Women's – 1 team of 13 athletes

Volleyball

Indoor

Men's – 1 team of 14 athletes
Women's – 1 team of 14 athletes

Beach
Men's – 2 team of 2 athletes
Women's – 2 team of 2 athletes

References

Nations at the 2015 European Games
European Games
2015